Carl David Tolmé Runge (30 August 1856 – 3 January 1927) was a German mathematician, physicist, and spectroscopist.

He was co-developer and co-eponym of the Runge–Kutta method, in the field of what is today known as numerical analysis.

Life and work
Runge spent the first few years of his life in Havana, where his father Julius Runge was the Danish consul. His mother was Fanny Schwartz Tolmé. The family later moved to Bremen, where his father died early (in 1864).

In 1880, he received his Ph.D. in mathematics at Berlin, where he studied under Karl Weierstrass.  In 1886, he became a professor at the Technische Hochschule Hannover in Hanover, Germany.

His interests included mathematics, spectroscopy, geodesy, and astrophysics.  In addition to pure mathematics, he did  experimental work studying spectral lines of various elements (together with Heinrich Kayser), and was very interested in the application of this work to astronomical spectroscopy.

In 1904, on the initiative of Felix Klein he received a call to the University of Göttingen, which he accepted. There he remained until his retirement in 1925.

Family
His daughter Iris also became a mathematician and his son Wilhelm was an early developer of radar. Another of his daughters, Nerina (Nina), married the mathematician Richard Courant.

Honors
The crater Runge on the Moon is named after him.
The Schumann–Runge bands of molecular oxygen are named after him and Victor Schumann.

See also
Runge's law
Runge's method for Diophantine equations.

Works
 Ueber die Krümmung, Torsion und geodätische Krümmung der auf einer Fläche gezogenen Curven (PhD dissertation, Friese, 1880)
 Praxis der Gleichungen (G.J. Göschen, Leipzig, 1900)
 Praxis der Gleichungen, zweite, verbesserte Auflage (W. de Gruyter, Berlin, 1921)
 Analytische Geometrie der Ebene (B.G. Teubner, Leipzig, 1908)
 Graphical methods; a course of lectures delivered in Columbia university, New York, October, 1909, to January, 1910 (Columbia University Press, New York, 1912)
 Graphische Methoden (Teubner, 1912)
 Graphische Methoden, dritte Auflage (Teubner, 1928)
 Vektoranalysis (S. Hirzel, Leipzig, 1919)
 Vector Analysis (Methuen & Co., London, 1923); translated from 1919 German original by H. Levy
 Carl Runge und Hermann König: Vorlesungen über numerisches Rechnen (Springer, Heidelberg, 1924)

Bibliography 
 
 Iris Runge: Carl Runge und sein wissenschaftliches Werk, Vandenhoeck & Ruprecht, Göttingen 1949.

References

External links

 
 Biography
 

1856 births
1927 deaths
Academic staff of the University of Göttingen
19th-century German mathematicians
19th-century German physicists
Numerical analysts
Scientists from Bremen
Spectroscopists
Academic staff of the University of Hanover
Humboldt University of Berlin alumni
20th-century German mathematicians
20th-century German physicists